Chan King-ming (born 17 March 1954) is a Hong Kong backstroke and medley swimmer who represented the Republic of China (Taiwan) in international competition. He competed in two events at the 1968 Summer Olympics. He later competed in swimming at the 1970 Asian Games.

References

External links
 
Photo of Chan and teammates in the pool at the Chavalit Hotel, Bangkok before the 1970 Asian Games (Central News Agency/Ministry of Culture)

1954 births
Living people
Hong Kong male backstroke swimmers
Hong Kong male medley swimmers
Olympic swimmers of Taiwan
Swimmers at the 1968 Summer Olympics
Swimmers at the 1970 Asian Games
Swimmers from Guangzhou
Asian Games competitors for Hong Kong